"If I Could Just Get to You" is a song recorded by Canadian country music artist Duane Steele. It was released in 1998 as the second single from his second studio album, This Is the Life. It peaked at number 10 on the RPM Country Tracks chart in April 1998.

Chart performance

Year-end charts

References

1997 songs
1998 singles
Duane Steele songs
Mercury Records singles
Songs written by Duane Steele